The mixed relay triathlon was part of the Triathlon at the 2018 Asian Games program, was held in JSC Lake Jakabaring on 31 August 2018. The race was held in four legs each one consisted of  swimming,  road bicycle racing, and  road running.

Japanese team managed to claim the gold medal in this event after clocked a total time of 1:30:39. South Korea and Hong Kong finished in the second and third position won the silver and bronze medal respectively.

Schedule
All times are Western Indonesia Time (UTC+07:00)

Results

References

External links 
 Results

Triathlon at the 2018 Asian Games